Fiorito may refer to:

 Villa Fiorito, a city in the Lomas de Zamora Partido of Buenos Aires Province, to the south of central Buenos Aires, Argentina
 Alfredo Fiorito (born 1953), Argentine-Spanish DJ
 Eunice K. Fiorito (1930-1999), American disability rights activist
 Joe Fiorito (born 1948), Canadian journalist and author
 John Fiorito (born 1936) American baritone opera singer
 Ted Fio Rito or Fiorito (1900-1971), American composer, orchestra leader, and keyboardist
 Vittorio Paolo Fiorito (1941-2015), Italian basketball referee

See also